Lake Houston is a reservoir on the San Jacinto River, 15 miles (24 km) northeast of downtown Houston, Texas, United States.  The reservoir is the primary municipal water supply for the city of Houston.

Location and creation
Situated between the communities of Kingwood, Atascocita and Humble on the west bank, Sheldon on the south, and Crosby and Huffman on the east. An earthen dam spans a portion of the southern bank along Dwight D. Eisenhower Park.

The reservoir was created in 1953 when the City of Houston built the dam to impound a reservoir to replace Sheldon Lake, then the primary source of water for the city.  The city sold Sheldon Lake to the Texas Parks and Wildlife Department for use as a waterfowl sanctuary and public fishing site.

The City of Houston annexed the Lake Houston area and a  canal in 1956.

Fish and plant populations
Lake Houston has been stocked with species of fish intended to improve the utility of the reservoir for recreational fishing. Fish present in Lake Houston include largemouth bass, white bass, white crappie, blue catfish, and bluegill.

Recreational uses
Boating and fishing are both popular recreational uses of the lake.  At the northern end of the lake, Lake Houston Wilderness Park has rental cabins, facilities for camping, a kayak launch and trails for hiking and biking.

References

External links

Lake Houston - Texas Parks & Wildlife
 
Lake Houston - Fishing Lake Houston

Houston
Protected areas of Harris County, Texas
Geography of Houston
Bodies of water of Harris County, Texas
1953 establishments in Texas